The 1891 Calgary municipal election was scheduled for January 5, 1891 to elect a Mayor and six Councillors to sit on the seventh Calgary Town Council from January 5, 1891 to January 18, 1892.

Background
Voting rights were provided to any male, single woman, or widowed British subject over twenty-one years of age who are assessed on the last revised assessment roll with a minimum property value of $200.

The election was held under multiple non-transferable vote where each elector was able to cast a ballot for the mayor and up to four ballots for separate councillors.

Results

Mayor

Councillors

See also
List of Calgary municipal elections

References

Sources
Frederick Hunter: THE MAYORS AND COUNCILS  OF  THE CORPORATION OF CALGARY Archived March 3, 2020

Municipal elections in Calgary
1891 elections in Canada
1890s in Calgary